This article lists the  margraves of Meissen, a march and territorial state on the eastern border of the Holy Roman Empire.

History
King Henry the Fowler, on his 928-29 campaign against the Slavic Glomacze tribes, had a fortress erected on a hill at Meissen (Mišno) on the Elbe river. Later named Albrechtsburg, the castle about 965 became the seat of the Meissen margraves, installed by Emperor Otto I when the vast Marca Geronis (Gero's march) was partitioned into five new margraviates, including  Meissen, the Saxon Eastern March, and also the Northern March which eventually became the Margraviate of Brandenburg. 

During the tenth century, the Meissen margraves temporarily extended their territory into the Milceni lands up to the Kwisa (Queis) river and the border with the Silesian region of the Early Polish state. The eastern lands around Bautzen (Budissin), later known as Upper Lusatia, were ceded to the Polish duke Bolesław I the Brave according to the 1018 Peace of Bautzen; in 1076 they passed to the Duke of Bohemia as an Imperial fief. 

From 1089, the Meissen margravial title became the honor of the Saxon House of Wettin and remained as the dynasty's possession ever since. In the 13th century the Meissen margraves acquired the former Pleissnerland territory and upon the War of the Thuringen Succession 1247–1264 also the adjacent Landgraviate of Thuringia in the west. Finally in 1423 Margrave Frederick the Warlike was enfeoffed with the Saxe–Wittenberg lands down the Elbe ('Upper Saxony'), an electorate according to the Golden Bull of 1356. While the Wettin rulers eventually moved their residence to Dresden, the Meissen margraviate merged into their electorate and became known as the 'Cradle of Saxony'.

List

As a title in pretense
After the abolition of all German monarchies in 1918 and the death of Friedrich August III, the last king of Saxony, in 1932, further heads of the house and pretenders to the throne have used the title Margrave of Meissen.

 Friedrich Christian, Margrave of Meissen
 Maria Emanuel, Margrave of Meissen
 Albert, Margrave of Meissen, disputed with Alexander
 Alexander, Margrave of Meissen, disputed with Albert and Ruediger
 Ruediger, Margrave of Meissen, disputed with Alexander
 Daniel, Margrave of Meissen, disputed with Alexander

See also
List of rulers of Thuringia
List of rulers of Saxony

References

External links
Margraves of Meissen and Ostmark

 
Lists of monarchs
Meissen
Saxon monarchs